Mary Pierce was the defending champion but lost in the quarterfinals to Kimberly Po.

Monica Seles won in the final 6–1, 6–4 against Arantxa Sánchez Vicario.

Seeds
A champion seed is indicated in bold text while text in italics indicates the round in which that seed was eliminated. The top four seeds received a bye to the second round.

  Monica Seles (champion)
  Arantxa Sánchez Vicario (final)
  Kimiko Date (semifinals)
  Mary Pierce (quarterfinals)
  Amanda Coetzer (quarterfinals)
  Ai Sugiyama (second round)
  Naoko Sawamatsu (quarterfinals)
  Shi-Ting Wang (quarterfinals)

Draw

Final

Section 1

Section 2

External links
 1996 Nichirei International Championships Draw

Nichirei International Championships
1996 WTA Tour